Dragonworld is an interactive fiction game with graphics. The game was published by Telarium (formerly Trillium), a subsidiary of Spinnaker Software, in the year 1984. The game was based on the novel written in 1979 by Byron Preiss and Michael Reaves; text for the game was written by J. Brynne Stephens.

Reception 
A German reviewer recognized the detailed graphics and the atmospheric fantasy prose. Text parser, graphics and storyline got the score "sehr gut" (very good).

External links 
 Dragonworld at Museum of Computer Adventure Game History by Howard Feldman

References 

1980s interactive fiction
1984 video games
Apple II games
Commodore 64 games
DOS games
MSX games
Video games based on novels
Video games developed in the United States
Telarium games